The Dance of Love and Happiness is a 1921 German silent film directed by Willy Zeyn and starring Werner Krauss, Olga Limburg and Hugo Flink. It premiered at the Marmorhaus in Berlin.

The film's sets were designed by the art director Franz Schroedter.

Cast
 Werner Krauss as Direktor Mac Sullivan
 Olga Limburg as Gladys
 Hugo Flink as Harry Gordon
 Elisabeth Grube as Sibyll
 Fritz Beckmann as Direktor des Varieté Fledermaus
 Karl Harbacher as Gordons Diener
 Gerhard Ritterband
 Danny Guertler
 Erna Offeney
 Emmy Sturm
 Marie Voigtsberger
 Ballett Erna Offeney

References

Bibliography
 Bock, Hans-Michael & Bergfelder, Tim. The Concise CineGraph. Encyclopedia of German Cinema. Berghahn Books, 2009.

External links

1921 films
Films of the Weimar Republic
German silent feature films
Films directed by Willy Zeyn
German black-and-white films
1920s German films